Warren Matthew Burrell (born 3 June 1990) is an English professional footballer who plays as a defender for  club Harrogate Town.

Career
Burrell is a graduate of the Mansfield Town youth academy, and made his first-team debut in the last game of the 2007–08 season against Dagenham & Redbridge, coming on as a substitute for Nathan Arnold. He was also captain of Mansfield's youth team, and signed a professional contract with the club in June 2008. On 12 January 2016 Warren re-signed with Harrogate Town.

Honours
Harrogate Town
National League play-offs: 2020
FA Trophy: 2019–20

References

External links

1990 births
Living people
Footballers from Sheffield
English footballers
Association football defenders
Association football midfielders
Mansfield Town F.C. players
Harrogate Town A.F.C. players
Sheffield F.C. players
Handsworth F.C. players
Leek Town F.C. players
Buxton F.C. players
English Football League players
National League (English football) players